In chemistry, bond order is a formal measure of the multiplicity of a covalent bond between two atoms. As introduced by Linus Pauling, bond order is defined as the difference between the numbers of electron pairs in bonding and antibonding molecular orbitals.

Bond order gives a rough indication of the stability of a bond. Isoelectronic species have the same bond order.

Examples

The bond order itself is the number of electron pairs (covalent bonds) between two atoms. For example, in diatomic nitrogen N≡N, the bond order between the two nitrogen atoms is 3 (triple bond). In acetylene H–C≡C–H, the bond order between the two carbon atoms is also 3, and the C–H bond order is 1 (single bond). In carbon monoxide, the bond order between carbon and oxygen is 3. In thiazyl trifluoride , the bond order between sulfur and nitrogen is 3, and between sulfur and fluorine is 1. In diatomic oxygen O=O the bond order is 2 (double bond). In ethylene  the bond order between the two carbon atoms is also 2. The bond order between carbon and oxygen in carbon dioxide O=C=O is also 2. In phosgene , the bond order between carbon and oxygen is 2, and between carbon and chlorine is 1.

In some molecules, bond orders can be 4 (quadruple bond), 5 (quintuple bond) or even 6 (sextuple bond). For example, potassium octachlorodimolybdate salt contains the  anion, in which the two Mo atoms are linked to each other by a bond with order of 4. Each Mo atom is linked to four  ligands by a bond with order of 1. The compound (terphenyl)–CrCr–(terphenyl) contains two chromium atoms linked to each other by a bond with order of 5, and each chromium atom is linked to one terphenyl ligand by a single bond. A bond of order 6 is detected in ditungsten molecules , which exist only in a gaseous phase.

Non-integer bond orders

In molecules which have resonance or nonclassical bonding, bond order may not be an integer. In benzene, the delocalized molecular orbitals contain 6 pi electrons over six carbons, essentially yielding half a pi bond together with the sigma bond for each pair of carbon atoms, giving a calculated bond order of 1.5 (one and a half bond). Furthermore, bond orders of 1.1 (eleven tenths bond), 4/3 (or 1.333333..., four thirds bond) or 0.5 (half bond), for example, can occur in some molecules and essentially refer to bond strength relative to bonds with order 1. In the nitrate anion, the bond order for each bond between nitrogen and oxygen is 4/3 (or 1.333333...). Bonding in dihydrogen cation  can be described as a covalent one-electron bond, thus the bonding between the two hydrogen atoms has bond order of 0.5.

Bond order in molecular orbital theory

In molecular orbital theory, bond order is defined as half the difference between the number of bonding electrons and the number of antibonding electrons as per the equation below. This often but not always yields similar results for bonds near their equilibrium lengths, but it does not work for stretched bonds. Bond order is also an index of bond strength and is also used extensively in valence bond theory.

bond order = 

Generally, the higher the bond order, the stronger the bond.

Hückel molecular orbital theory offers another approach for defining bond orders based on molecular orbital coefficients, for planar molecules with delocalized π bonding. The theory divides bonding into a sigma framework and a pi system. The π-bond order between atoms r and s derived from Hückel theory was defined by Charles Coulson by using the orbital coefficients of the Hückel MOs:

,

Here the sum extends over π molecular orbitals only, and ni is the number of electrons occupying orbital i with coefficients cri and csi on atoms r and s respectively. Assuming a bond order contribution of 1 from the sigma component this gives a total bond order (σ + π) of 5/3 = 1.67 for benzene, rather than the commonly cited bond order of 1.5, showing some degree of ambiguity in how the concept of bond order is defined.

For more elaborate forms of molecular orbital theory involving larger basis sets, still other definitions have been proposed. A standard quantum mechanical definition for bond order has been debated for a long time. A comprehensive method to compute bond orders from quantum chemistry calculations was published in 2017.

Other definitions
The bond order concept is used in molecular dynamics and bond order potentials. The magnitude of the bond order is associated with the bond length. According to Linus Pauling in 1947, the bond order between atoms i and j is experimentally described as

where d1 is the single bond length, dij is the bond length experimentally measured, and b is a constant, depending on the atoms. Pauling suggested a value of 0.353 Å for b, for carbon-carbon bonds in the original equation:

The value of the constant b depends on the atoms. This definition of bond order is somewhat ad hoc and only easy to apply for diatomic molecules.

References

Order